K21DO-D, virtual and UHF digital channel 21, is a low-powered, Class A 3ABN-affiliated television station licensed to Palm Springs, California, United States. Founded October 29, 1991, the station is owned by HC2 Holdings. The station was owned by 3ABN until 2017, when it was included in a $9.6 million sale of 14 stations to HC2 Holdings.

Programming
K21DO-D broadcasts programming from 3ABN, but also airs local church services from the Palm Springs Seventh-day Adventist Church, filling its local programming requirement for a Class A license; the station's studios are located at the facilities of the Palm Springs Seventh-day Adventist Church.

Digital channels
The station's signal is multiplexed:

References

External links
Palm Springs Seventh-day Adventist Church official site

Religious television stations in the United States
Innovate Corp.
21DO-D
Television channels and stations established in 1991
Low-power television stations in the United States
1991 establishments in California